Wendy Loretto is the Dean and Professor of Organizational Behaviour at the University of Edinburgh Business School and an expert in later-life employment.

Education 
Loretto holds a Bachelor of Commerce degree from the University of Edinburgh. After graduation, she worked as a commercial manager at Marks & Spencer. For three years she worked at the Alcohol Research Group at the University of Edinburgh, where she received her PhD in research on the social and cultural aspects of illicit and legal drug use by young people.

Work 
Loretto studies the relationship between sex, age and health. She focuses on how gender, health and age interact, particularly in changing attitudes and practices among employees and employers about extending working life.

References 

Year of birth missing (living people)
Living people
Marks & Spencer people
Professorships at the University of Edinburgh
Researchers in organizational studies